Fat Man and the Hard Blues is an album by jazz saxophonist Julius Hemphill recorded in 1991 for the Italian Black Saint label.

Reception
The Allmusic review by Scott Yanow awarded the album 5 stars stating "These miniatures (all under seven minutes) are most notable for their fresh melodies, logical arrangements, and spirited ensembles".

Track listing
All compositions by Julius Hemphill
 "Otis' Groove" - 3:00 
 "Lenny" - 2:33 
 "Floppy" - 2:50 
 "Opening" - 4:07 
 "Headlines" - 2:59 
 "Four Saints" - 2:45 
 "Fat Man" - 5:16 
 "Glide" - 4:32 
 "Tendrils" - 6:18 
 "Anchorman" - 4:41 
 "Untitled" - 5:10 
 "Three-Step" - 2:00 
 "The Answer" - 2:18 
 "The Hard Blues" - 6:40 
Recorded at Sear Sound in New York City on June 15 & 16, 1991

Personnel
Julius Hemphill - alto saxophone
Marty Ehrlich - soprano saxophone, alto saxophone, flute
Carl Grubbs - soprano saxophone, alto saxophone
James Carter - tenor saxophone
Andrew White - tenor saxophone
Sam Furnace - baritone saxophone, flute

References 

Black Saint/Soul Note albums
Julius Hemphill albums
1991 albums